Unexplained Phenomena is an album by American jazz saxophonist Rob Brown, which was recorded live at the 2010 Vision Festival and released on the French Marge label. He leads a new quartet with vibraphonist Matt Moran, bassist Chris Lightcap and drummer Gerald Cleaver.

Reception

The Down Beat review by Alain Drouot states "Brown shows that he also can conform to conventions, which is reflected in the structure of the pieces and the instrumentation. Ironically, the saxophonist’s playing is sonically more extreme: proof that even though Brown’s tone has been getting more polished over the years, its ferocity and tartness always come back to the fore when he is at his most incandescent."

Track listing
All compositions by Rob Brown
 "Kite" – 11:00
 "Wonder/Wander Off" – 9:56
 "Tic Toc" – 8:42
 "Lurking/Looking" – 11:51
 "Bell Tone" – 13:45

Personnel
Rob Brown – alto sax
Matt Moran - vibraphone
Chris Lightcap – bass
Gerald Cleaver – drums

References

2011 live albums
Rob Brown (saxophonist) live albums
Marge Records live albums
Albums recorded at the Vision Festival